Frank McGuigan is a former Gaelic footballer who played for the Ardboe O'Donnovan Rossa club and the Tyrone county team. Despite his playing career being cut short by a car crash, which broke his leg, he is considered a legend in Tyrone football, alongside players such as Frankie Donnelly and Peter Canavan. 

He was known for his scoring ability, clocking up dozens of scores during his senior career, most of them from open play.

His son Brian later played for Tyrone.

Underage level
In 1971, he was part of the Tyrone minor (under 18) team that defeated Fermanagh in the Ulster minor final.

The next year, 1972, McGuigan's inter-county contributions really started coming to the fore. He captained the minor team to another Ulster final victory, and eventually to the All-Ireland Minor Final. He also won the U-21 Ulster Championship, and came on as a substitute in the Tyrone Senior team in the Ulster Final.

Early senior career
McGuigan rose to the captaincy of the Tyrone Senior team, at the age of just nineteen leading the team to the 1973 Ulster Championship for the first time since 1957.

He was also successful al club level, 1972 being Ardboe's third county Championship victory in a row.

In 1977, McGuigan went to America as a representative of a touring Irish team, and decided to settle there after the tour was over, putting his playing career on temporary hiatus.

Later senior career
McGuigan returned from America in 1983, and got straight back into the Tyrone team and played in the Ulster Final of 1984. Against local rivals Armagh, McGuigan scored eleven of Tyrone's points from open play - five on each foot, and one fisted over. This is considered "one of the greatest individual performances in the modern G.A.A. era". It was voted as one of the Top 20 GAA Moments of the previous forty years (i.e. since the dawn of televised matches).

This tally helped McGuigan top the scorer's list in the Ulster Championship with a total of 0-19.

Career's premature end
McGuigan's Ulster Final display would prove to be his premature swansong. Days before receiving his All Star, McGuigan was involved in an horrific car crash that threatened, not only his playing career, but his life. He managed to get through the injuries, but his playing career was over.

Tyrone fans consider this one of the great tragedies of Tyrone football, especially considering Tyrone reached the All-Ireland final in 1986 for the very first time, in which McGuigan's ability would have been an advantage.

He has since rejected the All Star, due to his low esteem held for the accolade. He felt his own award was cheapened by accusations that it was a "sympathy vote," and after his son, Brian was overlooked in the 2005 honours, his opinion was strengthened.

Management
McGuigan entered his local club's management fold since the turn of the 21st century.

References

External links
 (Streaming video - RealPlayer) Highlights of the 1986 Ulster Final, with contributions from experts and McGuigan himself
Further biography from his local club, Ardboe's, website

1954 births
Living people
Tyrone inter-county Gaelic footballers